Daniel Lauby Jr. (born December 11, 1992) is an American professional darts player who plays in Professional Darts Corporation (PDC) and World Darts Federation (WDF) events. He is the son of fellow darts player Dan Lauby.

Career
Lauby made his World Series of Darts debut at the 2018 US Darts Masters, where he lost to James Wade of England in a last leg decider. He then went to PDC Qualifying School to earn his PDC Tour Card in 2019, but lost in the final on the second day of qualification and failed to gain a Tour Card.

In October 2019 Lauby beat Gary Mawson in the finals to win the CDC North American Continental Cup.  This win ultimately lead to Lauby qualifying to represent North America in the PDC World Championships beginning in December 2020.

At the end of 2019, Lauby held 5th place on the CDC North American Two Year Order of Merit and 6th place for the 2019 CDC North American Order of Merit for the year.

Lauby has attended PDC Qualifying School, in an effort to earn his PDC Tour Card in 2018, 2019, 2020 & 2021.

In the CDC USA Tour 2021, Lauby won two events and reached a final in six events. Lauby won the first two events by beating Leonard Gates and Gary Mawson, 6–2 and 6–1 respectively, but lost the final of the third event to Leonard Gates, 5–6. He topped the year-end rankings and secured a place in the World Championship for a second year running and a place at the CDC Continental Cup on November 20.

In January 2022 Lauby played again the Q-School. He qualified as first of the First Stage ranking for the Final Stage, but still failed to reach his goal Tour Card. But two weeks later he qualified via the Riley's Amateur Qualifier in Chorlton-cum-Hardy for the UK Open 2022, where he lost after wins over Niko Springer and Paul Hogan in the third round to Andy Boulton.

World Championship results

PDC
 2021: First round (lost to Ryan Searle 2–3)
 2022: First round (lost to William O'Connor 2–3)

WDF
 2023:

Performance timeline
PDC

References

External links

1992 births
Living people
American darts players
Professional Darts Corporation associate players
People from Terre Haute, Indiana
PDC World Cup of Darts American team